Volunteer Park Cafe & Pantry (VPC) is a restaurant in Seattle, in the U.S. state of Washington.

Description 

Volunteer Park Cafe & Pantry (VPC) is a restaurant operating from a small yellow house at the intersection of 17th Avenue East and Galer Street in Seattle's Capitol Hill neighborhood. Eater Seattle has described the business as a "hybrid coffee shop, bottleshop, and corner market".

Thrillist says, "VPC is slinging great pies daily, as well as refreshing libations and a stellar hangover-cure style brunch." The New York Times has described VPC as "cozy".

The menu has included avocado toast with za’atar, egg and cheese sandwiches, matzo ball soup, and Israeli couscous salad, and the pantry has stocked preserved blueberries, vegan chocolate, and canned tomatoes. VPC has also served cakes, cookies, and other pastries.

History 
VPC is housed in a  building which operated as a convenience store. The restaurant closed in 2020, before reopening in 2021. VPC is owned by Crystal Chiu and Melissa Johnson.

Reception 
Allecia Vermillion included the business in Seattle Metropolitan's 2022 list of "exceptional" breakfast sandwiches. Emma Banks and Bradley Foster included VPC in Thrillist's 2022 list of "The Absolute Best Brunches in Seattle Right Now".

References

External links 

 
 

Capitol Hill, Seattle
Coffee in Seattle
Coffeehouses and cafés in Washington (state)
Convenience stores of the United States
Restaurants in Seattle